Dioscorea acanthogene is a herbaceous vine in the genus Dioscorea; it is native to Bolivia, west-central Brazil, Colombia, Paraguay, and Peru.
A specimen collected in Bolivia in 2002 was obtained from a scrubby roadside in a dry, sparsely forested area.

References 

acanthogene